Chon Daen is a district (amphoe) in the western part of Phetchabun province, northern Thailand.

History
Chon Daen minor district (king amphoe) was created in 1917. It was upgraded to a full district in 1956.

Geography
Neighboring districts are (from the north clockwise) Wang Pong, Mueang Phetchabun, Nong Phai and Bueng Sam Phan of Phetchabun Province, Nong Bua of Nakhon Sawan province, and Dong Charoen and Tap Khlo of Phichit province.

Administration
The district is divided into nine sub-districts (tambons), which are further subdivided into 125 villages (mubans). There are three townships (thesaban tambons): Chon Daen covers parts of tambon Chon Daen, Dong Khui parts of tambons Dong Khui and Takut Rai, and Tha Kham covers parts of tambon Tha Kham. There are nine tambon administrative organizations.

References

Chon Daen